Bei'an is a county-level city in west-central Heilongjiang province in the People's Republic of China. It is under the jurisdiction of Heihe.
Bei'an was the provincial capital of Bei'an province of Manchukuo, a puppet state set up by Japan during the Second World War.

Administrative divisions

There are six subdistricts, five towns and four townships under the city's administration:

Subdistricts (街道)
Heping Subdistrict
Zhaolin Subdistrict
Qinghua Subdistrict
Tiexi Subdistrict
Tienan Subdistrict
Beigang Subdistrict

Towns (镇)
Tongbei
Zhaoguang
Shiquan
Haixing
Erjing

Townships (乡)
Chengjiao Township
Dongsheng Township
Yangjia Township
Zhuxing Township

Climate

References

External links

Cities in Heilongjiang
County level divisions of Heilongjiang
Heihe